Acanthoceras is a genus of radially symmetric planktonic diatoms comprising two taxonomically accepted species. They do not have any raphe and therefore lack motility. It appears rectangular with two setae extending from each valve. Not much is known about this genus because it is easily destroyed using common preparation techniques. They can be found all over North America in small lakes and short-lasting ponds.

Species 
The type species is currently recognized is A. madgeburgense.

 A. madgeburgense
 A. zachariasii

References 

 Spaulding, S., Edlund, M. (2009). Acanthoceras. In Diatoms of North America. Retrieved March 11, 2022, from https://diatoms.org/genera/acanthoceras

Coscinodiscophyceae
Coscinodiscophyceae genera